Mellet (in  Old French  Meflet) (pronounced [məlɛ] by the inhabitants) is a village of Wallonia and a district of the municipality of Les Bons Villers, located in the province of Hainaut, Belgium.

Geography 
Mellet is crossed by a stream called Tintia. The Tintia flows into the Piéton. It is part of the Meuse basin. The altitude of Mellet is 140 meters.

Recent history 
In 1977, five villages (Frasnes-lez-Gosselies, Mellet, Rèves, Villers-Perwin and Wayaux) came together to form the commune of Les Bons Villers. Mellet was a municipality in its own right before the merger of the municipalities.

Heritage 

 An old Roman road separates Mellet from the neighbouring village of villers-Perwin. Its layout is still very visible.
 The Dungeon of Mellet, the only vestige of the old medieval castle, is today a tourist center. We can find a local museum inside of it.
 The birthplace of Saint Mutien-Marie (Louis-Joseph Wiaux) (1841-1917) can be found behind the church.

Activities 

 A theatre group regularly gives performances in Walloon language.
 A riding school called Le Relais du Maitreya offers riding lessons.
 The village has had its own music group, the Harmonie Royale de Mellet, since 1893.
 The village also has a Scout unit.

Former municipalities of Hainaut (province)